is a passenger railway station located in the city of Ōtsu, Shiga Prefecture, Japan, operated by the private railway company Keihan Electric Railway.

Lines

Station layout
The station consists of two opposed unnumbered side platforms. Each platform has its own separate exit and there is no interconnection between platforms. The station is unattended.

Platforms

Adjacent stations

History
Miidera Station was opened on May 7, 1922.

Passenger statistics
In fiscal 2018, the station was used by an average of 929 passengers daily (boarding passengers only).

Surrounding area
 Lake Biwa Canal
 Biwako Boat Racecourse
 Mii-dera
Otsu City Nagara Elementary School

See also
List of railway stations in Japan

References

External links

Keihan official home page

Railway stations in Shiga Prefecture
Stations of Keihan Electric Railway
Railway stations in Japan opened in 1922
Railway stations in Ōtsu